Charles Cromwell Williams (February 9, 1896 – January 31, 1975) was a railway worker and political figure in Saskatchewan, Canada. He represented Regina City in the Legislative Assembly of Saskatchewan as a Co-operative Commonwealth Federation (CCF) member from 1944 to 1964.

He was born in Moosomin, Saskatchewan and was educated in Wapella and at Brandon College. Williams was hired as a telegraph operator in Manitoba for the Canadian Pacific Railway. He was wounded while serving in the Canadian Army during World War I. On his return, Williams worked as a station agent for the Grand Trunk Railway in the Canadian prairies, moving to Regina in 1931. He was elected to Regina city council in 1937 but was defeated in 1939. Williams ran unsuccessfully for a seat in the provincial assembly in a 1938 by-election. He was an unsuccessful candidate for mayor of Regina in 1940 and then served as mayor from 1942 to 1944. Williams was Minister of Labour in the province's Executive Council. He later served on Regina city council from 1965 to 1973. Williams died during a vacation in Vancouver at the age of 78.

References

Saskatchewan Co-operative Commonwealth Federation MLAs
20th-century Canadian politicians
Mayors of Regina, Saskatchewan
1896 births
1975 deaths